Francis Parker may refer to:

People 
Francis Wayland Parker (1837–1902), champion of progressive education in the United States
Francis Parker (The Fairly OddParents), a teenage villain from the animated series The Fairly OddParents
Francis Parker (UK politician) (1851–1931), British Member of Parliament for Henley, 1886–1895
Francis R. Parker (1800–1894), farmer, lawyer and political figure in Nova Scotia
Francis H. Parker (1920–2004), American philosopher
Francis Hubert Parker (1850–1927), American attorney and judge

Schools 
Francis W. Parker School (Chicago), founded in 1901
Francis W. Parker School (San Diego), founded in 1912
Francis W. Parker Charter Essential School, in Devens, Massachusetts, founded in 1995

See also
Frances Parker (1875–1924), British suffragette
Frank Parker (disambiguation)

Parker, Francis